Back Forest is a locality in the City of Shoalhaven in New South Wales, Australia. It lies to the north of the Shoalhaven River and to the east of Broughton Creek. It is northeast of Nowra.

References

City of Shoalhaven
Localities in New South Wales